Snyder Solomon Kirkpatrick (February 21, 1848 – April 5, 1909) was an American attorney and politician who served as a U.S. representative from Kansas.

Early life and education 
Kirkpatrick was born near Mulkeytown, Illinois to John Foster Kirkpatrick and Hester Ann Dial Kirkpatrick. He attended public schools schools.

Career 
During the Civil War, he served as a private in Company A of the 136th Illinois Cavalry Regiment from April to October 1864. He re-enlisted in the 20th Illinois Cavalry but that had been filled before he reached rendezvous with the regiment. He tried again for the 63rd Regiment of Infantry in which his brothers William A. and Reuben D. were serving, but before he arrived to serve with that regiment the war had ended.

Kirkpatrick engaged in mercantile pursuits at Du Quoin, Illinois from 1865 to 1867. He entered the law school at the University of Michigan in 1867 before returning to Illinois. He was admitted to the bar by the supreme court of Illinois on June 30, 1868, and commenced practice at Cairo, Illinois.

In 1873, Kirkpatrick moved to Kansas and settled in Fredonia, engaging in the practice of law. He was elected prosecuting attorney of Wilson County in 1880, and served as a member of the Kansas State Senate from 1889 to 1893. He was an attorney for the St. Louis and San Francisco Railway Company for many years.

Kirkpatrick was an unsuccessful candidate for election in 1892 to the Fifty-third Congress. He was then elected as a Republican to the Fifty-fourth Congress (March 4, 1895 – March 3, 1897). He ran for reelection to the Fifty-fifth Congress and for election to the Fifty-sixth and Fifty-seventh Congresses but was unsuccessful. Kirkpatrick served as member of the Kansas State house of representatives 1903-1905.

Personal life 
On December 25, 1867 he married Rosa H. Bowen in Mattoon, Coles Co., IL. Rosa and Solomon has five children: Elsie; Otto; Mark; Byron; and Hobert. Rosa died at Fredonia on 13 February 1887. Kirkpatrick remarried. His second wife was Mrs. Floren Adell (Oakford) Buker of Chicago.

Kirkpatrick died in Fredonia, Kansas on April 5, 1909 and was interred in Fredonia Cemetery.

References

1848 births
1909 deaths
Republican Party members of the Kansas House of Representatives
Republican Party Kansas state senators
Union Army soldiers
People from Fredonia, Kansas
University of Michigan Law School alumni
Republican Party members of the United States House of Representatives from Kansas
19th-century American politicians
People from Franklin County, Illinois
People from Cairo, Illinois
People of Illinois in the American Civil War
Illinois lawyers
Kansas lawyers